DAQ or variation, may refer to:

 Data acquisition, the sampling of the real world to generate data that can be manipulated by a computer
 Delivered Audio Quality, a measure of audio quality over a transmission medium
 Madiya language (ISO 639 language code: daq)
 Changping railway station (Guangdong) (station code DAQ), in Changping, Dongguang, Guangdong, China
 "DAQ", the code for Dominion Arsenal; see List of military headstamps
 DJ DaQ, disc jockey on Show Me the Money (South Korean TV series) seasons 4,5,6

See also

 
 DAC (disambiguation)
 DAK (disambiguation)
 Dack (disambiguation)